Sinphu Samten Tsemo Lhakhang is a 15th-century Buddhist temple built in the Trongsa district of Bhutan.

Citations

15th-century Buddhist temples
Buddhist temples in Bhutan